Afan Lido Football Club is a football team based in Port Talbot, Wales, playing in the Cymru South.

History
Afan Lido F.C. were founded in 1967 shortly after the opening of the Afan Lido Sports Centre in Aberavon. A football team was set up to give the Centre's users a proper organisation. Ken Williams was the prime mover behind the club.

Lido gained admission to the Port Talbot and District League for the 1967–68 season. In 1971–72 the club was accepted into the Welsh Football League, and two years later was promoted into the First Division (afterwards the Second Division), and another two years later they were promoted again into the Premier Division (afterwards the First Division). After a barren spell they were relegated but were promoted in 1984–85; by this time the League had been reorganised and a higher National Division had been formed, to which Afan Lido were promoted in 1989–90 after finishing 3rd (they had actually won the Premier Division the two previous seasons, but not been promoted because of the ground criteria set by the League). 

Afan Lido became founder members of the League of Wales in 1992, and won the League Cup in 1992–93 and 1993–94. The next year the porous defence was addressed, and the team finished in second place in the League, winning a UEFA Cup place, but they were defeated by RAF Yelgava of Latvia on the away-goals rule. This was a taste of things to come, and Afan Lido were relegated from the League of Wales before winning their place back after an absence of two years.

Lido's young team that emerged during the spell out of the League of Wales grew together and the club enjoyed several encouraging seasons after settling again in the top flight. Lido's policy of choosing players from within the club's huge junior structure (which has 25 teams for all age groups, from under 5s upwards) paid off, when they finished 5th place in 2001–02. If the club had scored a single point more, in fact, Lido would have taken the town into European football for a second time.

Leaner years followed that near miss, and in 2005 the club left the Welsh Premier in controversial circumstances, after being deducted points for fielding an ineligible player in a league game. The points deducted sunk the Lido into the relegation zone below NEWI Cefn Druids, which sealed their fate.

In 2011 Lido secured a return to the Welsh Premier and their first season in the top flight saw the club survive the drop. The club also won the Welsh Premier League Cup, defeating Newtown on penalties at Aberystwyth. 

Off-field issues surfaced the following season, however, and Lido had to assemble an all-new squad under the guidance of Paul Reid. The club finished bottom of the Welsh Premier, but survived relegation due to the demise of Llanelli and the inability of Haverfordwest County to finish in a promotion spot in Welsh League Division One.

On 4 July 2013 Afan Lido appointed former club captain and fans favourite Paul Evans to the hotseat as they look to cement their position within the top division.

For the 2016–17 season, the club found themselves in the same division as town rivals Port Talbot.

Current squad
As of 4 October 2018.

Staff
 Director of Football: Mark Robinson
 Coach: Paul Evans
 Physio: Doug Mallen

Stadium

They play at the Lido Ground, currently known as the Marston's Stadium for sponsorship purposes. It's located in Aberavon, Neath Port Talbot and has a capacity of 4,200 (601 seated).

Rivalries
Afan Lido's main rivals are Port Talbot Town, who are based less than half a mile away from Afan Lido's ground.

Honours
 Welsh League Cup winners (3): 1992/93, 1993/94, 2011/12
 Welsh Football League Cup winners (2): 2006/07, 2008/09
 U16’s Neath Port Talbot league Cup Winners 
2018/19

Biggest victories and losses
Biggest win: 9–1 v. Dinas Powys in 2010.
Biggest defeat: 2–8 v. Port Talbot Town in 2014.
Biggest League of Wales win: 6–0 v. Abergavenny Thursdays in 1993.
Biggest League of Wales defeat: 0–6 v. Barry Town in 1995.

Managers
 Phil Robinson / David Rees (1992–93)
 Dai Rees (1993–94)
 Nigel Rees (1994–96)
 Mark Robinson (1998–06)
 Phil Holmes / Paul Evans (2006–09)
 Craig Duggan (2009–10)
 Kim Bowley (2010–11)
 Andrew Dyer (1 July 2011 – 30 June 2012)
 Paul Reid (2012–13)
 Paul Evans (1 July, 2013–2014)
 Stephen Llewellyn (2014–2015)
 Mark Robinson (2015– 2016)
 Liam McCreesh (2016–2017)
 Wayne Davies (2017–2018)
 Andrew Mumford (2018–2019)

References

External links
Official club website
Old website
Unofficial Fansite
Official Disabillity club website

Football clubs in Wales
Sport in Port Talbot
Association football clubs established in 1967
Cymru Premier clubs
1967 establishments in Wales
Welsh Football League clubs
Cymru South clubs